Suhaimi Mat Hassan (born 24 June 1976 in FELDA Mempaga, Bentong, Pahang, Malaysia) is a Malaysian professional football referee. He has been a full international for FIFA since 2010.

He refereed in five editions of FIFA Beach Soccer World Cup, namely Italy 2011, Tahiti 2013, Portugal 2015, Paraguay 2019, and Russia 2021. For the 2021 editions, he refereed the final between Russia and Japan.

References 

1976 births
Living people
Malaysian football referees